Eupoecilia amphimnesta is a species of moth of the  family Tortricidae. It is found in China (Anhui, Beijing, Chongqing, Hainan, Hebei, Heilongjiang, Henan, Hubei, Hunan, Fujian, Gansu, Guangdong, Guangxi, Guizhou, Jiangxi, Liaoning, Ningxia, Shaanxi, Shanxi, Sichuan, Tianjin, Xinjiang, Yunnan, Zhejiang), Taiwan, India, Japan, Korea, Mongolia, Russia and Europe.

References

Moths described in 1928
Eupoecilia